Yousef Ahmed Masrahi (Arabic:يوسف مسرحي) (born 31 December 1987, in Najran) is a Saudi Arabian track and field athlete, who specialises in the 400 metres sprint. His personal best time for the event is 43.93 seconds, set in 2015, and is the Asian record.

Masrahi represented his country at the 2012 London Olympics and is a three-time participant at the World Championships in Athletics (2009, 2013, 2015). He was the gold medallist at both the Asian Athletics Championships in 2011 and at the 2014 Asian Games. He was banned for doping in 2016 for four years.

Career
His first international outing came in middle-distance events at the 2007 Asian Indoor Games. He failed to finish in the 800 metres, but set a national indoor record of 4:11.28 minutes in the 1500 metres heats. He won his first medal at the competition in the 4×400 metres relay, taking the gold alongside Hamdan Al-Bishi, Ali Al-Deraan and Hamed Al-Bishi. In the 2008 season he was based in California and began to run in the 200 metres and 400 metres instead, setting best times of 21.80 and 46.45 seconds in the events.

Masrahi won the national title over 200 m in 2009 and improved his 400 m best to 45.84 seconds in Riyadh, gaining the "B" qualifying standard. He represented Saudi Arabia at the 2009 World Championships in Athletics, but was knocked out in the 400 m heats. He was the bronze medalist in the distance at the Arab Athletics Championships and also won the relay title with Saudi Arabia. At the 2009 Asian Indoor Games in November Masrahi was just beaten to the 400 m title by Ismail Al-Sabiani, another Saudi runner, but the pair teamed up in the relay to set a Games record and national record time of 3:10.31 minutes.

The 2010 Asian Games was his focus for the next season and he gained selection after winning a 200/400 m double at the national championships. He ran personal best of 45.48 seconds in the heats of the 400 m at the Asian Games, but was little slower in the final and took the bronze medal. With the relay team he anchored the men home to a Saudi national record of 3:02.30 minutes, running with Al-Sabiani, Mohammed Al-Salhi and Al-Bishi to win the Asian Games title. The next year, he won the 400 m gold medal at the 2011 Asian Athletics Championships in Kobe, Japan, and also won a silver medal in the relay. In 2014, he won the gold medal for the men's 400m in 44.6 sec.

He set his personal best, the Asian record during the qualifying heats of the 2015 World Championships, finishing barely ahead of Rusheen McDonald who was credited with the same time, 43.93 which at the time ranked both men in the top dozen in history.  With two more rounds to run, McDonald was unable to qualify for the final, while Masrahi did, but his remarkable speed was not present in that final where even his personal best would only have been good enough for fourth place.

He was banned from competition for four years, starting 15 June 2016, prior to the 2016 Rio Olympics due to a failed drug test.

References

External links
 

Living people
1987 births
People from Najran
Saudi Arabian male sprinters
Olympic athletes of Saudi Arabia
Athletes (track and field) at the 2012 Summer Olympics
Athletes (track and field) at the 2016 Summer Olympics
Asian Games gold medalists for Saudi Arabia
Asian Games bronze medalists for Saudi Arabia
Asian Games medalists in athletics (track and field)
Athletes (track and field) at the 2010 Asian Games
Athletes (track and field) at the 2014 Asian Games
World Athletics Championships athletes for Saudi Arabia
Saudi Arabian sportspeople in doping cases
Doping cases in athletics
Medalists at the 2010 Asian Games
Medalists at the 2014 Asian Games
20th-century Saudi Arabian people
21st-century Saudi Arabian people